The red-legged crake (Rallina fasciata) is a waterbird in the rail and crake family, Rallidae.

Description
It is a medium-large crake (length 24 cm). Its head, neck and breast red-brown, paler on throat. Its upper parts are grey-brown. Underparts and underwings are barred black and white. Its bill is green and its legs are red.

Distribution and habitat
Found in far north-eastern India, eastern Bangladesh, Burma, Thailand, Malay Peninsula, Borneo and Indonesia. It is recorded as a vagrant to north-western Australia. It is located in dense vegetation close to permanent wetlands.

Behaviour

Breeding

Its clutch consists of 3-6 dull-white eggs.

Voice
Series of descending croaks, screams and grunts.

Conservation
With a large range and no evidence of significant decline, this species is assessed as being of least concern.

References

 BirdLife International. (2007). Species factsheet: Rallina fasciata. Downloaded from http://www.birdlife.org on 14/6/2007
 Marchant, S.; Higgins, P.J.; & Davies, J.N. (eds). (1994). Handbook of Australian, New Zealand and Antarctic Birds.  Volume 2: Raptors to Lapwings. Oxford University Press: Melbourne.  
 Smythies, B.E.; & Davison, G.W.H. (1999). The Birds of Borneo. Natural History Publications (Borneo), in association with the Sabah Society: Kota Kinabalu. 

red-legged crake
Birds of Southeast Asia
red-legged crake